Monts may refer to the following places in France:

 Monts, Indre-et-Loire, a commune in the Indre-et-Loire department
 Monts, Oise, a commune in the Oise department
 Alexander von Monts, German naval officer

See also
 Monts Castle, Switzerland
 Mont (disambiguation)